Néstor Salazar (born December 19, 1973) is a Colombian  former football forward.

Titles

References

1973 births
Living people
Association football forwards
Atlético Bucaramanga footballers
Deportivo Cali footballers
Cortuluá footballers
América de Cali footballers
Atlético Nacional footballers
Club de Gimnasia y Esgrima La Plata footballers
Deportivo Pereira footballers
S.D. Quito footballers
Deportes Quindío footballers
Boyacá Chicó F.C. footballers
Deportivo Pasto footballers
Real Cartagena footballers
Independiente Santa Fe footballers
Águilas Doradas Rionegro players
Categoría Primera A players
People from Palmira, Valle del Cauca
Centauros Villavicencio footballers
Colombian footballers
Colombian expatriate footballers
Expatriate footballers in Argentina
Expatriate footballers in Ecuador
Colombia international footballers
Sportspeople from Valle del Cauca Department